The 2009 Denver Outlaws season was the fourth season for the Outlaws in Major League Lacrosse. Coming off of their second championship loss and an 8–4 record in the previous year, the Outlaws were looking to avenge themselves. They would end up finishing with a 9–3 record and clinch a playoff spot for the fourth consecutive time. However, they would end up losing in the championship game for the third time to the Toronto Nationals by a 10–9 score.

Offseason
The Outlaws acquired Max Seibald, the 2nd overall pick out of Cornell, 7th overall pick Shane Walterhoefer out of North Carolina, and 8th overall pick Dan Hardy from Syracuse in the 2009 Major League Lacrosse Collegiate Draft

Regular season

Schedule

Postseason

Standings

References

External links
 Team Website 

Major League Lacrosse seasons
Denver Outlaws